The Georgia Governor's Honors Program (commonly referred to as "GHP") is a summer educational program in the state of Georgia, in the United States. It is a four-week (formerly six-week prior to 2011, and originally eight-week) summer instructional program for intellectually gifted and artistically talented high school students of Georgia.

Rising juniors and seniors in Georgia's public and private high schools may be nominated for the free program by their teachers. The program's entire cost is covered by the state of Georgia. The Governor's Honors Program began in 1964 with 400 participants and was hosted at Wesleyan College. It first took place at Valdosta State University from 1980 through 2016 (sometimes cohosted at North Georgia College in Dahlonega), then was relocated to Berry College in Rome, Georgia from 2017 through 2022, and is now hosted at Georgia Southern University.

There is no cost to attend GHP for students. Tuition, room, and board are covered under appropriations made by the Georgia General Assembly. However, students are asked to bring basic school supplies (binders, notebook paper, notebooks, pens, etc.) for class. GHP is an ungraded summer program. Students are not required to take any exit exams or standardized tests regarding major courses of study. Credits are not issued for completion of the program. Students that complete the entire four weeks of study receive a certificate of completion.

Nomination 
Students are nominated in a specific instructional area in which their abilities, aptitudes, and interest lie. Each school system or private school is assigned a nomination quota based on the average daily attendance of its 10th and 11th grades.
Transcripts of grades and records, nomination forms, endorsements and other pertinent information are submitted to substantiate the nominations. Selected nominees then submit written essays and/or videos of their work. Each district or county has a different nomination process. From there, selected applicants are sent to statewide screening interviews/auditions.

The written evidence and data gathered in the student interview/audition are used to rank nominees and select finalists.

The overall acceptance rate of the program in 2017 was around 21%. However, this does not include the large number of students who were eliminated in school and county rounds or were not nominated. 

In 2017, 58% of GHP students were from metro area public schools, 32% of students were from non-metro area public schools, and 10% of students were from private schools or were home schooled.

Instruction 
Major instructional areas are communicative arts (English), Spanish, French, Latin, German, Mandarin Chinese, mathematics, science,  agricultural science, social studies, visual arts, theatre performance, theatre design, music (woodwinds, piano, brass, strings, vocal, and percussion), dance, and engineering (design, electromechanical, and software). Staff in four support areas (Counseling, Fitness, Computers, and Library/Media) also work to assist the student body.

In 2017, the program hosted 450 students in academic major areas and 217 students in fine arts major areas. Among that student population were 72 world language majors, 75 communicative arts majors, 78 social studies majors, 225 STEM (Science, Technology, Engineering, and Mathematics) majors, 32 dance majors, 35 theatre majors, 46 visual arts majors, and 104 music majors.

Students may choose an elective in the first week of the program. The electives are commonly known as minors and include all the major areas of study along with others including Journalism, Counseling, Education, Ballroom dancing, Gender Studies, and Songwriting.

Each student receives 4.5 hours of major subject time on Mondays to Saturdays and 2 hours of elective subject time on Mondays to Fridays. Other time is free for meals, research, performances, practice, or seminars (see below).

GHP instructors are chosen according to their experience and recommendations. The student to teacher ratio is mandated to be at or very close to 15:1. In 2017, the student to faculty ratio was 13:1.

Seminars

Residential Advisors and faculty host seminars outside of instructional time, ranging from learning Hebrew, learning how to make impromptu presentations, or making friendship bracelets.

Alumni
The following are notable alumni of the Georgia Governor's Honors Program, listed with their GHP major, year of attendance, and notable accomplishments:

References

External links 
 GHP summer program website
 Georgia Department of Education GHP webpage
 GHP Alumni Association

Gifted education
Education in Georgia (U.S. state)
Governor's Schools